Henry Valentine Miller (December 26, 1891 – June 7, 1980) was an American novelist. He broke with existing literary forms and developed a new type of semi-autobiographical novel that blended character study, social criticism, philosophical reflection, stream of consciousness, explicit language, sex, surrealist free association, and mysticism. His most characteristic works of this kind are Tropic of Cancer, Black Spring, Tropic of Capricorn, and the trilogy The Rosy Crucifixion, which are based on his experiences in New York and Paris (all of which were banned in the United States until 1961). He also wrote travel memoirs and literary criticism, and painted watercolors.

Early life
Miller was born at his family's home, 450 East 85th Street, in the Yorkville section of Manhattan, New York City. He was the son of Lutheran German parents, Louise Marie (Neiting) and tailor Heinrich Miller. As a child, he lived for nine years at 662 Driggs Avenue in Williamsburg, Brooklyn, known at that time (and referred to frequently in his works) as the Fourteenth Ward. In 1900, his family moved to 1063 Decatur Street in the Bushwick section of Brooklyn. After finishing elementary school, although his family remained in Bushwick, Miller attended Eastern District High School in Williamsburg. As a young man, he was active with the Socialist Party of America (his "quondam idol" was the black Socialist Hubert Harrison). He attended the City College of New York for one semester.

Career

Brooklyn, 1917–1930
Miller married his first wife, Beatrice Sylvas Wickens, in 1917; their divorce was granted on December 21, 1923. Together they had a daughter, Barbara, born in 1919. They lived in an apartment at 244 6th Avenue in Park Slope, Brooklyn. At the time, Miller was working at Western Union; he worked there from 1920 to 1924, as personnel manager in the messenger department. In March 1922, during a three-week vacation, he wrote his first novel, Clipped Wings. It has never been published, and only fragments remain, although parts of it were recycled in other works, such as Tropic of Capricorn. A study of twelve Western Union messengers, Clipped Wings was characterized by Miller as "a long book and probably a very bad one."

In 1923, while he was still married to Beatrice, Miller met and became enamored of a mysterious dance-hall ingénue who was born Juliet Edith Smerth but went by the stage-name June Mansfield. She was 21 at the time. They began an affair, and were married on June 1, 1924. In 1924 Miller quit Western Union in order to dedicate himself completely to writing. Miller later describes this time – his struggles to become a writer, his sexual escapades, his failures, his friends, his philosophy – in his autobiographical trilogy The Rosy Crucifixion.

Miller's second novel, Moloch: or, This Gentile World, was written in 1927–28, initially under the guise of a novel written by his wife Juliet (June). A rich older admirer of June, Roland Freedman, paid her to write the novel; she would show him pages of Miller's work each week, pretending it was hers. The book went unpublished until 1992, 65 years after it was written and 12 years after Miller's death. Moloch is based on Miller's first marriage, to Beatrice, and his years working as a personnel manager at the Western Union office in Lower Manhattan. A third novel written around this time, Crazy Cock, also went unpublished until after Miller's death. Initially titled Lovely Lesbians, Crazy Cock (along with his later novel Nexus) told the story of June's close relationship with the artist Marion, whom June had renamed Jean Kronski. Kronski lived with Miller and June from 1926 until 1927, when June and Kronski went to Paris together, leaving Miller behind, which upset him greatly. Miller suspected the pair of having a lesbian relationship. While in Paris, June and Kronski did not get along, and June returned to Miller several months later. Kronski committed suicide around 1930.

Paris, 1930–1939
In 1928, Miller spent several months in Paris with June, a trip which was financed by Freedman. One day on a Paris street, Miller met another author, Robert W. Service, who recalled the story in his autobiography: "Soon we got into conversation which turned to books. For a stripling he spoke with some authority, turning into ridicule the pretentious scribes of the Latin Quarter and their freak magazine." In 1930, Miller moved to Paris unaccompanied. Soon after, he began work on Tropic of Cancer, writing to a friend, "I start tomorrow on the Paris book: First person, uncensored, formless – fuck everything!" Although Miller had little or no money the first year in Paris, things began to change after meeting Anaïs Nin who, with Hugh Guiler, went on to pay his entire way through the 1930s including the rent for an apartment at 18 Villa Seurat. Nin became his lover and financed the first printing of Tropic of Cancer in 1934 with money from Otto Rank. She would write extensively in her journals about her relationship with Miller and his wife June; the first volume, covering the years 1931–34, was published in 1966. Late in 1934, June divorced Miller by proxy in Mexico City.

In 1931, Miller was employed by the Chicago Tribune Paris edition as a proofreader, thanks to his friend Alfred Perlès, who worked there. Miller took this opportunity to submit some of his own articles under Perlès' name, since at that time only the editorial staff were permitted to publish in the paper. This period in Paris was highly creative for Miller, and during this time he also established a significant and influential network of authors circulating around the Villa Seurat. At that time a young British author, Lawrence Durrell, became a lifelong friend. Miller's correspondence with Durrell was later published in two books. During his Paris period he was also influenced by the French Surrealists.

His works contain detailed accounts of sexual experiences. His first published book, Tropic of Cancer (1934), was published by Obelisk Press in Paris and banned in the United States on the grounds of obscenity. The dust jacket came wrapped with a warning: "Not to be imported into the United States or Great Britain." He continued to write novels that were banned; along with Tropic of Cancer, his Black Spring (1936) and Tropic of Capricorn (1939) were smuggled into his native country, building Miller an underground reputation. While the aforementioned novels remained banned in the US for over two decades, in 1939, New Directions published The Cosmological Eye, Miller's first book to be published in America. The collection contained short prose pieces, most of which originally appeared in Black Spring and Max and the White Phagocytes (1938).

Miller became fluent in French during his ten-year stay in Paris and lived in France until June 1939. During the late 1930s Miller also learned about German-born sailor George Dibbern, helped to promote his memoire Quest and organized charity to help him.

Greece, 1939–1940
In 1939 Lawrence Durrell, British novelist who was living in Corfu, Greece, invited Miller to Greece. Miller described the visit in The Colossus of Maroussi (1941), which he considered his best book. One of the first acknowledgments of Henry Miller as a major modern writer was by George Orwell in his 1940 essay "Inside the Whale", where he wrote:

Here in my opinion is the only imaginative prose-writer of the slightest value who has appeared among the English-speaking races for some years past. Even if that is objected to as an overstatement, it will probably be admitted that Miller is a writer out of the ordinary, worth more than a single glance; and after all, he is a completely negative, unconstructive, amoral writer, a mere Jonah, a passive acceptor of evil, a sort of Whitman among the corpses.

California, 1942–1980

In 1940, Miller returned to New York; after a year-long trip around the United States, a journey that would become material for The Air-Conditioned Nightmare, he moved to California in June 1942, initially residing just outside Hollywood in Beverly Glen, before settling in Big Sur in 1944. While Miller was establishing his base in Big Sur, the Tropic books, then still banned in the US, were being published in France by the Obelisk Press and later the Olympia Press. There they were acquiring a slow and steady notoriety among both Europeans and the various enclaves of American cultural exiles. As a result, the books were frequently smuggled into the States, where they proved to be a major influence on the new Beat Generation of American writers, most notably Jack Kerouac, the only Beat writer Miller truly cared for. By the time his banned books were published in the 1960s and he was becoming increasingly well-known, Miller was no longer interested in his image as an outlaw writer of smut-filled books; however, he eventually gave up fighting the image.

In 1942, shortly before moving to California, Miller began writing Sexus, the first novel in The Rosy Crucifixion trilogy, a fictionalized account documenting the six-year period of his life in Brooklyn falling in love with June and struggling to become a writer. Like several of his other works, the trilogy, completed in 1959, was initially banned in the United States, published only in France and Japan.
Miller lived in a small house on Partington Ridge from 1944 to 1947, along with other bohemian writers like Harry Partch, Emil White, and Jean Varda. While living there, he wrote "Into the Nightlife". He writes about his fellow artists who lived at Anderson Creek as the Anderson Creek Gang in Big Sur and the Oranges of Hieronymus Bosch. Miller paid $5 per month rent for his shack on the property.

In other works written during his time in California, Miller was widely critical of consumerism in America, as reflected in Sunday After the War (1944) and The Air-Conditioned Nightmare (1945). His Big Sur and the Oranges of Hieronymus Bosch, published in 1957, is a collection of stories about his life and friends in Big Sur.

In 1944, Miller met and married his third wife, Janina Martha Lepska, a philosophy student who was 30 years his junior. They had two children: a son, Tony, and a daughter, Valentine. They divorced in 1952. The following year, he married artist Eve McClure, who was 37 years his junior. They divorced in 1960, and she died in 1966, likely as a result of alcoholism. In 1961, Miller arranged a reunion in New York with his ex-wife and main subject of The Rosy Crucifixion trilogy, June. They had not seen each other in nearly three decades. In a letter to Eve, he described his shock at June's "terrible" appearance, as she had by then degenerated both physically and mentally.

In 1948, Miller wrote a novella which he called his "most singular story," a work of fiction entitled "The Smile at the Foot of the Ladder".

In February 1963, Miller moved to 444 Ocampo Drive, Pacific Palisades, Los Angeles, California, where he would spend the last 17 years of his life. In 1967, Miller married his fifth wife, Japanese born singer Hoki Tokuda (:ja:ホキ徳田). In 1968, Miller signed the "Writers and Editors War Tax Protest" pledge, vowing to refuse tax payments in protest against the Vietnam War. After his move to Ocampo Drive, he held dinner parties for the artistic and literary figures of the time. His cook and caretaker was a young artist's model named Twinka Thiebaud who later wrote a book about his evening chats. Thiebaud's memories of Miller's table talk were published in a rewritten and retitled book in 2011.

Only 200 copies of Miller's 1972 chapbook On Turning Eighty were published. Published by Capra Press, in collaboration with Yes! Press, it was the first volume of the "Yes! Capra" chapbook series and is 34 pages in length. The book contains three essays on topics such as aging and living a meaningful life. In relation to reaching 80 years of age, Miller explains:

If at eighty you're not a cripple or an invalid, if you have your health, if you still enjoy a good walk, a good meal (with all the trimmings), if you can sleep without first taking a pill, if birds and flowers, mountains and sea still inspire you, you are a most fortunate individual and you should get down on your knees morning and night and thank the good Lord for his savin' and keepin' power.

Miller and Tokuda divorced in 1977. Then in his late 80s, Miller filmed with Warren Beatty for the 1981 film Reds, which was also directed by Beatty. He spoke of his remembrances of John Reed and Louise Bryant as part of a series of "witnesses". The film was released eighteen months after Miller's death. During the last four years of his life, Miller held an ongoing correspondence of over 1,500 letters with Brenda Venus, a young Playboy model and columnist, actress and dancer. A book about their correspondence was published in 1986.

Death
Miller died of circulatory complications at his home in Pacific Palisades, Los Angeles, on June 7, 1980, at the age of 88. His body was cremated and his ashes shared between his son Tony and daughter Val. Tony has stated that he ultimately intends to have his ashes mixed with those of his father and scattered in Big Sur.

US publication of previously banned works
The publication of Miller's Tropic of Cancer in the United States in 1961 by Grove Press led to a series of obscenity trials that tested American laws on pornography. The U.S. Supreme Court, in Grove Press, Inc., v. Gerstein, citing Jacobellis v. Ohio (which was decided the same day in 1964), overruled the state court findings of obscenity and declared the book a work of literature; it was one of the notable events in what has come to be known as the sexual revolution. Elmer Gertz, the lawyer who successfully argued the initial case for the novel's publication in Illinois, became Miller's lifelong friend; a volume of their correspondence has been published. Following the trial, in 1964–65, Miller's other books, which had also been banned in the US, were published by Grove Press: Black Spring, Tropic of Capricorn, Quiet Days in Clichy, Sexus, Plexus and Nexus. Excerpts from some of these banned books, including Tropic of Cancer, Black Spring and Sexus, were first published in the US by New Directions in The Henry Miller Reader in 1959.

Watercolors
In addition to his literary abilities, Miller produced numerous watercolor paintings and wrote books on this field. He was a close friend of the French painter Grégoire Michonze. It is estimated that Miller painted 2,000 watercolors during his life, and that 50 or more major collections of Miller's paintings exist. The Harry Ransom Center at the University of Texas at Austin holds a selection of Miller's watercolors, as did the Henry Miller Museum of Art in Ōmachi City in Nagano, Japan, before closing in 2001. Miller's daughter Valentine placed some of her father's art for sale in 2005. He was also an amateur pianist.

Literary archives

Miller's papers can be found in the following library special collections:
 Southern Illinois University Carbondale, which has correspondence and other archival collections.
 Syracuse University, which holds a portion of the correspondence between the Grove Press and Henry Miller.
 Charles E. Young Research Library of the University of California, Los Angeles Library.
 Harry Ransom Center at the University of Texas at Austin, which has materials about Miller from his first wife and their daughter.
 University of Victoria, which holds a significant collection of Miller's manuscripts and correspondence, including the corrected typescripts for Max and Quiet Days in Clichy, as well as Miller's lengthy correspondence with Alfred Perlès.
 University of Virginia.
 Beinecke Rare Book and Manuscript Library, Yale University Library.
 University of Pennsylvania Libraries, Philadelphia, PA.

Miller's friend Emil White founded the nonprofit Henry Miller Memorial Library in Big Sur in 1981. This houses a collection of his works and celebrates his literary, artistic and cultural legacy by providing a public gallery as well as performance and workshop spaces for artists, musicians, students, and writers.

Literary references

Miller is considered a "literary innovator" in whose works "actual and imagined experiences became indistinguishable from each other." His books did much to free the discussion of sexual subjects in American writing from both legal and social restrictions. He influenced many writers, including Lojze Kovačič, Richard Brautigan, Jack Kerouac, Norman Mailer, Vitomil Zupan, Philip Roth, Cormac McCarthy, Paul Theroux and Erica Jong.

Throughout his novels he makes references to other works of literature; he cites Fyodor Dostoyevsky, Joris-Karl Huysmans, Balzac and Nietzsche as having a formative impact on him.

Tropic of Cancer is referenced in Junot Díaz's 2007 book The Brief Wondrous Life of Oscar Wao as being read by Ana Obregón. Miller's legal difficulties, Tropic of Cancer and Tropic of Capricorn are mentioned in Denis Johnson's 2007 novel Tree of Smoke, in a conversation between Skip Sands and his uncle, Colonel Sands. Miller is mentioned again later in the novel. Miller's relationship with June Mansfield is the subject of Ida Therén's 2020 novel Att omfamna ett vattenfall.

Bibliography

Films

Miller as himself
Miller appeared as himself in several films:
 He was the subject of four documentary films by Robert Snyder; The Henry Miller Odyssey (1969; 90 minutes), Henry Miller: Reflections On Writing (47 minutes), and Henry Miller Reads and Muses (60 minutes). In addition, there is a film by Snyder that was completed after Snyder's death in 2004 about Miller's watercolor paintings, Henry Miller: To Paint Is To Love Again (60 minutes). All four films are in Miller's own words.
 He was a "witness" (interviewee) in Warren Beatty's 1981 film Reds.
 He was featured in the 1996 documentary Henry Miller Is Not Dead that featured music by Laurie Anderson.
 Henry Miller: Prophet der Lüste (Henry Miller: Prophet of Desire), a biographical documentary TV movie in 2017 by a German director Gero von Boehm, which also features Erica Jong, Brassaï, and Anaïs Nin.

Actors portraying Miller
Several actors played Miller on film, such as:
 Rip Torn in the 1970 film adaptation of Tropic of Cancer.
 In the 1970 film adaptation of Quiet Days in Clichy, the Miller-based character of 'Joey' was played by Paul Valjean.
 Fred Ward in the 1990 film Henry & June, based on the diaries of Anaïs Nin.
 David Brandon in the 1990 film The Room of Words, also based on Nin's diaries.
 Claude Chabrol's 1990 film adaptation of Quiet Days in Clichy saw Andrew McCarthy play Miller.
 In Mara (2015), a short film by Mike Figgis, a dramatization of Mara-Marignan from Quiet Days in Clichy he was portrayed by Scott Glenn, while Mara by Juliette Binoche. The 20 minute film was originally shot and broadcast as part of HBO's anthology film Women & Men 2 (1991).
 In 2018 Trevor White in the TV series The Durrells in Corfu season 3, episodes 3 and 7, as recurring role.

References

Further reading
 Rejaunier, Jeanne. My Sundays With Henry Miller: A Memoir, Scotts Valley, California: CreateSpace, 2013. 
 Rexroth, Kenneth. "The Reality of Henry Miller" and "Henry Miller: The Iconoclast as Everyman's Friend" (1955–1962 essays)
 Durrell, Lawrence, editor. The Henry Miller Reader, New York: New Directions Publishing, 1959. 
 Widmer, Kingsley. Henry Miller, New York: Twayne, 1963.
 Revised edition, Boston: Twayne, 1990. 
 Wickes, George, and Harry Thornton Moore. Henry Miller and the Critics, Carbondale: Southern Illinois University Press, 1963.
 Wickes, George. Henry Miller, Minneapolis: University of Minnesota Press, 1966.
 Gordon, William A. The Mind and Art of Henry Miller, Baton Rouge: Louisiana State University Press, 1967.
 Dick, Kenneth C. Henry Miller: Colossus of One, Holland: Alberts, 1967.
 Brassaï. Henry Miller: The Paris Years, New York: Arcade Publishing, 1975. 
 Mailer, Norman. Genius and Lust: a Journey Through the Major Writings of Henry Miller, New York: Grove Press, 1976. 
 Martin, Jay. Always Merry and Bright: The Life of Henry Miller, Santa Barbara, CA: Capra Press, 1978. 
 Kraft, Barbara. A Conversation with Henry Miller, Michigan: Michigan Quarterly Review, Published at The University of Michigan, 1981.
 Kraft, Barbara. An Open Letter to Henry Miller, Paris, France: Handshake Editions, 1982.
 Young, Noel, editor. The Paintings of Henry Miller: Paint as You Like and Die Happy, Santa Barbara, CA: Capra Press, 1982. 
 Nin, Anaïs. Henry and June: From the Unexpurgated Diary of Anaïs Nin, Orlando: Harcourt Brace, 1986. 
 Winslow, Kathryn. Henry Miller: Full of Life, Los Angeles: J. P. Tarcher, 1986. 
 Brown, J. D. Henry Miller, New York: Ungar, 1986. 
 Stuhlmann, Gunther, editor. A Literate Passion: Letters of Anaïs Nin and Henry Miller, 1932–1953, San Diego: Harcourt Brace Jovanovich, 1987. 
 Ibarguen, Raoul R. Narrative Detours: Henry Miller and the Rise of New Critical Modernism, excerpts from Ph.D. thesis, 1989.
 Dearborn, Mary V. The Happiest Man Alive: A Biography of Henry Miller, New York: Simon & Schuster, 1991. 
 Ferguson, Robert. Henry Miller: A Life, New York: W. W. Norton & Company, 1991. 
 Kraft, Barbara. Last Days of Henry Miller, New York: Hudson Review, 1993.
 Jong, Erica. The Devil at Large: Erica Jong on Henry Miller, New York: Turtle Bay Books, 1993. 
 Fitzpatrick, Elayne Wareing. Doing It With the Cosmos: Henry Miller's Big Sur Struggle for Love Beyond Sex, Philadelphia: Xlibris, 2001. 
 Brassaï. Henry Miller, Happy Rock, Chicago: University of Chicago Press, 2002. 
 Masuga, Katy. Henry Miller and How He Got That Way, Edinburgh: Edinburgh University Press, 2011. 
 Masuga, Katy. The Secret Violence of Henry Miller, Rochester, NY: Camden House Publishing, 2011. 
 Turner, Frederick. Renegade: Henry Miller and the Making of Tropic of Cancer, New Haven: Yale University Press, 2011. 
 Kraft, Barbara. "Henry Miller:  The Last Days", Huffington Post, 2013.
 Männiste, Indrek. Henry Miller: The Inhuman Artist: A Philosophical Inquiry, New York: Bloomsbury, 2013. 
 Hoyle, Arthur. The Unknown Henry Miller: A Seeker in Big Sur, New York: Arcade Publishing, 2014. 
 Kraft, Barbara. Henry Miller: The Last Days, San Antonio, TX: Sky Blue Press, 2016. 
 Twinka Thiebaud. What Doncha Know about Henry Miller, Eio Books, 2011.

External links

 Nexus: The International Henry Miller Journal
 Henry Miller, a Personal Collection by his daughter, Valentine
 Henry Miller Online by Dr. Hugo Heyrman, a tribute
 Cosmodemonic Telegraph Company: A Henry Miller Blog
 Guide to the Henry Miller Letters to E.E. Schmidt and Other Material. Special Collections and Archives, The UC Irvine Libraries, Irvine, California.
 
 
 FBI Records: The Vault – Henry Miller at fbi.gov
 Henry Miller Papers. Yale Collection of American Literature, Beinecke Rare Book and Manuscript Library.
Multimedia
 
 Schiller, Tom, director.  (1975), a 34-minute video
 Miller documentaries by Robert Snyder at Masters & Masterworks
 Young, Richard, director. Dinner with Henry Miller (1979), a 30-minute video
 UbuWeb Sound: Henry Miller (1891–1980), with links to MP3 files of "An Interview with Henry Miller" (1964), "Life As I See It" (1956/1961), and "Henry Miller Recalls and Reflects" (1957)
 Smithsonian Folkways. An Interview with Henry Miller  (1964), with link to transcript (in "liner notes")

 
1891 births
1980 deaths
20th-century American novelists
American erotica writers
American essayists
American expatriates in France
American male novelists
20th-century American memoirists
American people of German descent
American tax resisters
Analysands of Otto Rank
Obscenity controversies in literature
People from Yorkville, Manhattan
People from Williamsburg, Brooklyn
People from Bushwick, Brooklyn
Writers from Manhattan
Writers from Brooklyn
American male essayists
City College of New York alumni
Western Union people
American travel writers
Big Sur
People from Pacific Palisades, California
Novelists from New York (state)
20th-century essayists
Eastern District High School alumni
20th-century American male writers
Lost Generation writers
People from Big Sur, California
Members of the American Academy of Arts and Letters